Alberto Mina (born May 2, 1982) is a Brazilian mixed martial artist who competed in the Welterweight division of the Ultimate Fighting Championship.

Biography
A native of Campina Grande in northeast Brazil, Mina began his career at the age of 5, when his parents decided to make him learn some sport for being very active as a kid. He started training Judo, being taught by an old friend of the family, the master Roberto Fialho. Since a very young age, Alberto started being noticed because of his competitiveness and sense of discipline inside the dojo.

The city and the gym where he was based was the perfect environment to develop his ability. Campina Grande, has a huge tradition in martial arts. Mina's sensei, Roberto Fialho, is a direct disciple of the great Ivan Gomes, a man who competed all over the world in the early Vale-Tudo era during the 1950s until the late 1970s with a non-official record of 600 fights with 570 victories and 30 draws, having never lost a fight. Roberto Fialho is a coral belt (red and white belt) in Judo and Black belt in Jiu-Jitsu. He was the coach of a lot of the city's best fighters like the four-time Olympic judoka Edinanci Silva. Fialho himself was a World Black Belt Senior Champion in 2001 and Bronze Medal in 2006.

Jiu-jitsu and submission career 
Under the guidance of Fialho, Mina switched to jiu-jitsu in 1997, where he managed to understand the foundations of the sport very well, due to his prior experience in Judo, using his creativity to develop his own style and a fine technique. Mina soon began to be acknowledged in his local scenario, where as a teenager, he was able to compete and win in various Jiu-Jitsu championships.

His competitive soul always led him to learn different features of a lot of different sports to improve his technique in Jiu-Jitsu. As a natural athlete, during his teenager years Mina also practiced and competed in Judo, Swimming, Handball and Volleyball, always looking for ways to improve his athleticism to compete in Jiu-Jitsu. He also made his transition to submission grappling which was one important step for him to begin his career in Mixed Martial Arts.

In 2004, Mina was already an established jiu-jitsu fighter and instructor at Fialho Academy. By that time, he was experiencing submission grappling where he competed and had some of his best performances in fighting. Back then, there was a great rivalry between the fighting gyms in Campina Grande, where Mina's name was acknowledged as one of the best. Mina was then spotted and advised by his friend Jean Silva and finally made his transition to Mixed Martial Arts.

With over 15 years of experience, he is now a 3rd Degree Judo Black Belt and 3rd Degree Jiu-Jitsu Black Belt, representing Draculino Fight Team. Amongst several titles and participations in State, Northeast and North/Northeast Championships, one of his greatest titles was the double gold at the European Urban Gorillaz Submission Championship, where he conquered both welterweight and open class titles in 2006.

He has also won the Asian Open Championship twice, in 2015 and 2016 at Welterweight, and has participated in other events like Abu-Dhabi Pro.

Mixed martial arts 
Mina joined the Jean Silva Combat Team in 2005. In MMA where he showcased all his talent by combining resources of the different sports he competed. He made his professional debut in October 2005 in a local event in his hometown called CageFight Nordeste.

He compiled a record of 10–0 interspersed with periods of inactivity, competing for several regional promotions around the world before signing with the UFC in January 2014.

Ultimate Fighting Championship
Mina was set to make his promotional debut against Zak Cummings on March 1, 2014 at The Ultimate Fighter China Finale. However, at the weigh-ins for the event, Cummings came in eight pounds over the welterweight limit.  On the advice of his coaches, Mina would not agree to compete at a catch weight, so the bout was scratched from the event.

Mina was expected to face Sheldon Westcott on August 23, 2014 at UFC Fight Night 48. However, in the days leading up to the event, Westcott pulled out of the bout citing an injury and was replaced by Shinsho Anzai. He won the fight via TKO in the first round and was awarded a Performance of the Night bonus.

Mina returned to face Yoshihiro Akiyama on November 28, 2015 at UFC Fight Night 79. He won the back-and-forth fight via split decision.

Mina next faced Mike Pyle on July 7, 2016 at UFC Fight Night 90. He won via knockout in the second round.

Mina faced Ramazan Emeev on May 12, 2018 at UFC 224. He lost the fight via unanimous decision.

Mina was expected to face Warlley Alves on May 11, 2019 at UFC 237. However just days after the announcement of the pairing leaked, Mina indicated that he had never agreed to the fight and had not signed a bout agreement.

Since his last bout, he was released from the UFC.

Championships and accomplishments
Ultimate Fighting Championship
Performance of the Night (One time) vs. Shinsho Anzai

Mixed martial arts record

|-
|Loss
|align=center|13–1
|Ramazan Emeev
|Decision (unanimous)
|UFC 224
|
|align=center|3
|align=center|5:00
|Rio de Janeiro, Brazil
|
|-
|Win
|align=center|13–0
|Mike Pyle
|KO (flying knee and punches)
|UFC Fight Night: dos Anjos vs. Alvarez
|
|align=center|2
|align=center|1:17
|Las Vegas, Nevada, United States
|
|-
| Win
| align=center| 12–0
| Yoshihiro Akiyama
| Decision (split)
| UFC Fight Night: Henderson vs. Masvidal
| 
| align=center| 3
| align=center| 5:00
| Seoul, South Korea
| 
|-
| Win
| align=center| 11–0
| Shinsho Anzai
| TKO (punches)
| UFC Fight Night: Bisping vs. Le
| 
| align=center| 1
| align=center| 4:17
| Macau, SAR, China
| 
|-
| Win
| align=center| 10–0
| Glenn Sparv
| TKO (knees and punches)
| Rebel FC 1
| 
| align=center| 1
| align=center| 2:44
| Kallang, Singapore
| 
|-
| Win
| align=center| 9–0
| Boy Eggels
| Submission (armbar)
| UFG 1
| 
| align=center| 1
| align=center| 3:11
| Kallithea, Greece
| 
|-
| Win
| align=center| 8–0
| Dean Amasinger
| TKO (punches)
| UCMMA 10
| 
| align=center| 3
| align=center| 2:17
| London, England
| 
|-
| Win
| align=center| 7–0
| Edgelson Lua
| Submission (armbar)
| UCMMA 10
| 
| align=center| 1
| align=center| 3:26
| London, England
|
|- 
| Win
| align=center| 6–0
| Steven Elliott
| Submission (rear-naked choke)
| Cage Rage 28
| 
| align=center| 1
| align=center| 2:55
| London, England
|
|- 
| Win
| align=center| 5–0
| Michel Ribeiro
| TKO (retirement)
| MCVT
| 
| align=center| 3
| align=center| 1:31
| João Pessoa, Brazil
| 
|- 
| Win
| align=center| 4–0
| Jose Enrique Anton
| Submission (rear-naked choke)
| ZTFN 2
| 
| align=center| 1
| align=center| 1:34
| London, England
| 
|- 
| Win
| align=center| 3–0
| Mickael Slomczynski
| Submission (kimura)
| Intense Fighting 3
| 
| align=center| 1
| align=center| 3:55
| Peterborough, England
| 
|- 
| Win
| align=center| 2–0
| Michel Ribeiro
| TKO (punches)
| Instigação Combat 1
| 
| align=center| 1
| align=center| 3:29
| Campina Grande, Brazil
| 
|- 
| Win
| align=center| 1–0
| Jeferson Fibiru
| Submission (armbar)
| Cage Fight Nordeste
| 
| align=center| 1
| align=center| 3:37
| Campina Grande, Brazil
|

See also
 List of current UFC fighters
 List of male mixed martial artists

References

External links
 
 

Brazilian male mixed martial artists
Welterweight mixed martial artists
Mixed martial artists utilizing judo
Mixed martial artists utilizing Brazilian jiu-jitsu
Living people
1982 births
People from Campina Grande
Ultimate Fighting Championship male fighters
Brazilian practitioners of Brazilian jiu-jitsu
People awarded a black belt in Brazilian jiu-jitsu
Brazilian male judoka
Sportspeople from Paraíba